Acton is an Census Designated Place in northwestern Yellowstone County, Montana, United States. It has a postal ZIP code (59002) and lies along Montana Highway 3 northwest of the city of Billings, the county seat of Yellowstone County.

History

Acton is a small farming community which originated as a stop on the Great Northern Railroad.  The post office was opened in 1910. Charles T. Robinson served as the original postmaster.

The village experienced a small boom with the opening of the Yellowstone Drag Strip race facility, six miles due west of the old train stop. The depot and elevators are no longer active.

Demographics

Climate
According to the Köppen Climate Classification system, Acton has a semi-arid climate, abbreviated "BSk" on climate maps.

References

Unincorporated communities in Yellowstone County, Montana
Unincorporated communities in Montana